Carlo Micheluzzi (1886–1973) was an Italian stage and film actor.

Selected filmography
 We Were Seven Widows (1939)
 Before the Postman (1942)
 C'è sempre un ma! (1942)
 I Live as I Please (1942)
 Love Story (1942)
 The Lady Is Fickle (1942)
 The Innkeeper (1944)
 The Devil's Gondola (1946)
 The Tyrant of Padua (1946)
 Toto Tours Italy (1948)
 Sul ponte dei sospiri (1953)

References

Bibliography
 Joseph Farrell & Paolo Puppa. A History of Italian Theatre. Cambridge University Press, 2006.

External links

1886 births
1973 deaths
Italian male film actors
Italian male stage actors
19th-century Neapolitan people